Oleksandr Yevtushok (Ukrainian: Олекса́ндр Васи́льович Євтушо́к, born 11 January 1970), sometimes called Alex Evtushok in the British media, is a Ukrainian former professional footballer who played as a central defender.

Club career
Yevtushok was born in Dzhankoy, Ukrainian SSR. He started his career in 1990 at SC Tavriya Simferopol, where he played the last two seasons of the Soviet First League. In 1992, he joined Naftovyk Okhtyrka, a team which was previously in the fourth tier of the Soviet League, for the inaugural Ukrainian Premier League season. The club was relegated and then finished in third place in the 1992–93 Ukrainian First League. He also played in the 1992–93 Ukrainian Second League for Yavir Krasnopillya, which also finished the third place.

He joined Karpaty Lviv in 1993 and scored the winning goal in the 1993–94 European Cup Winners' Cup match against Shelbourne, which was the club's first European win. He moved to Dnipro Dnipropetrovsk in 1995, but later return to Karpaty Lviv on loan in 1996.

Yevtushok was signed by Premier League club Coventry City in 1997, becoming the first Ukrainian footballer to play in the competition (besides Andrei Kanchelskis, who decided to play for Russia). In his debut, against Manchester United, he was replaced just after 30 minutes in a 3–1 loss. He had two other appearances and was released after Coventry City escaped relegation on the final matchday.

He later returned to Ukraine and spent the rest of 1997 for FC Zirka Smila in the Ukrainian Football Amateur League, returning to Karpaty Lviv in the following year. He last played for FC CSKA Kyiv in 2000.

International career
Yevtushok earned eight caps for the Ukraine national team.

References

1970 births
Living people
People from Dzhankoy
Soviet footballers
Ukrainian footballers
Association football defenders
Association football midfielders
Ukraine international footballers
Premier League players
SC Tavriya Simferopol players
FC Spartak Sumy players
FC Karpaty Lviv players
FC Karpaty-2 Lviv players
FC Dnipro players
FC Naftovyk-Ukrnafta Okhtyrka players
Coventry City F.C. players
FC Arsenal Kyiv players
FC CSKA Kyiv players
Ukrainian expatriate footballers
Ukrainian expatriate sportspeople in England
Expatriate footballers in England
Ukrainian Jehovah's Witnesses